This is a list of notable bakery cafés. A bakery (or baker's shop) is an establishment that produces and sells flour-based food baked in an oven such as bread, cookies, cakes, pastries, and pies. Some retail bakeries are also coffeehouses, serving coffee and tea to customers who wish to consume the baked goods on the premises. A café, cafe, or "caff" may refer to a coffeehouse, bar, teahouse, diner, transport cafe, or other casual eating and drinking place, depending on the culture.

Bakery cafés

See also

 Fast casual restaurant
 List of baked goods
 List of bakeries
 List of coffeehouse chains
 List of doughnut shops
 List of tea houses
 Lists of restaurants
 Pâtisserie
 Types of restaurant

References

 
Lists of restaurants
Food industry-related lists
Coffee organizations